Clio (formerly, Wash) is a census-designated place in Plumas County, California, United States. The population was 66 at the 2010 census, down from 90 at the 2000 census.

Toponymy
The original name was Wash; a post office with that name was opened in 1875.

In 1905, according to local folklore, prominent citizens decided that the name "Wash" was too often mistaken for the town of Washington, in Nevada County on the south fork of the Yuba River. As suggested by Postmaster Fred King, it was decided the new name of their community should be Clio, the trade name prominently cast into the door of the heating stove they were looking at.

Geography
Clio is located at  (39.745044, -120.571412).

Demographics

2010
The 2010 United States Census reported that Clio had a population of 66. The racial makeup of Clio was 64 (97.0%) White, 0 (0.0%) African American, 0 (0.0%) Native American, 0 (0.0%) Asian, 1 (1.5%) Pacific Islander, 1 (1.5%) from other races, and 0 (0.0%) from two or more races. Hispanic or Latino of any race were 1 persons (1.5%).

The Census reported that 66 people (100% of the population) lived in households, 0 (0%) lived in non-institutionalized group quarters, and 0 (0%) were institutionalized.

There were 39 households, out of which 4 (10.3%) had children under the age of 18 living in them, 14 (35.9%) were opposite-sex married couples living together, 2 (5.1%) had a female householder with no husband present, 0 (0%) had a male householder with no wife present.  There were 0 (0%) unmarried opposite-sex partnerships, and 1 (2.6%) same-sex married couples or partnerships. 21 households (53.8%) were made up of individuals, and 10 (25.6%) had someone living alone who was 65 years of age or older. The average household size was 1.69.  There were 16 families (41.0% of all households); the average family size was 2.56.

The population was spread out, with 7 people (10.6%) under the age of 18, 3 people (4.5%) aged 18 to 24, 7 people (10.6%) aged 25 to 44, 31 people (47.0%) aged 45 to 64, and 18 people (27.3%) who were 65 years of age or older.  The median age was 56.0 years. For every 100 females, there were 94.1 males.  For every 100 females age 18 and over, there were 90.3 males.

The homeowner vacancy rate was 8.3%; the rental vacancy rate was 0%.  60 people (90.9% of the population) lived in owner-occupied housing units and 6 people (9.1%) lived in rental housing units.

2000
As of the census of 2000, there were 90 people, 39 households, and 26 families residing in the CDP. The racial makeup of the CDP was 98.89% White, and 1.11% from two or more races. 3.33% of the population were Hispanic or Latino of any race.

There were 39 households, out of which 30.8% had children under the age of 18 living with them, 56.4% were married couples living together, 7.7% had a female householder with no husband present, and 33.3% were non-families. 28.2% of all households were made up of individuals, and 15.4% had someone living alone who was 65 years of age or older. The average household size was 2.31 and the average family size was 2.81.

In the CDP, the population was spread out, with 23.3% under the age of 18, 3.3% from 18 to 24, 18.9% from 25 to 44, 27.8% from 45 to 64, and 26.7% who were 65 years of age or older. The median age was 47 years. For every 100 females, there were 100 males. For every 100 females age 18 and over, there were 91.7 males.

The median income for a household in the CDP was $23,036, and the median income for a family was $42,917. Males had a median income of $11,250 versus $0 for females. The per capita income for the CDP was $14,560. None of the population and none of the families were below the poverty line.

Politics

See also
Clio trestle

References

Census-designated places in Plumas County, California
Census-designated places in California